Dr. C.V. Raman University, Bihar (CVRU) is a private university located at Bhagwanpur in Vaishali district, Bihar, India. The university was established in 2018 by the All India Society for Electronics & Computer Technology (AISECT) under the Bihar Private Universities Act, 2013, the fourth of six private universities planned in Bihar, following the first two private universities, K. K. University and Sandip University, Sijoul and later Amity University, Patna. The university was approved by the Bihar Cabinet on 10 January 2018, notified in the gazette on 7 February 2018 and the university became active in the July 2018 session. The university offers various diploma, undergraduate and postgraduate courses in five faculties. It is named after the first Nobel Laureate of the country, C.V. Raman.

Academics
The institute offers diploma, undergraduate and postgraduate courses through fiv faculties:
 Faculty of Commerce and Management
 Faculty of Arts & Humanities
 Faculty of Science
 Faculty of Computer Science & IT
 Faculty of Agriculture
 Faculty of Engineering and Technology

Department of Political Science 
 HoD : Dr Manish Ranjan

References

External links

Universities and colleges in Vaishali district
Universities in Bihar
Educational institutions established in 2018
2018 establishments in Bihar
Private universities in India